Sydney Nettleton Fisher (August 8, 1906 – December 10, 1987) was an American historian of the Middle East.

Life
Fisher was born in Warsaw, New York. He studied at Oberlin College, gaining an economics degree in 1928 and an M. A. degree in history in 1932. He received his PhD in history from the University of Illinois in 1935. After teaching mathematics at Robert College in Istanbul, he joined the history faculty of Ohio State University in 1937. He gained full professorship in 1955, and retired in 1972.

Works
 The Foreign Relations of Turkey, 1481-1512, 1948
 Social Forces in the Middle East, 1955
 The Middle East: A History, 1959
 The Military in the Middle East; Problems in Society and Government, 1963
 (ed.) France and the European Community, 1963
 (ed. with John J. TePaske) Explosive Forces in Latin America, 1964
 (ed.) New Horizons for the United States in World Affairs, 1966

References

1906 births
1987 deaths
Historians of the Middle East
Oberlin College alumni
University of Illinois alumni
Ohio State University faculty
People from Warsaw, New York
20th-century American historians
American male non-fiction writers
Historians from New York (state)
20th-century American male writers